Sørrollnes Chapel is a chapel of the Church of Norway in Ibestad Municipality in Troms og Finnmark county, Norway. It is located in the village of Sørrollnes, serving the western part of the island of Rolla. It is an annex chapel for the Ibestad parish which is part of the Trondenes prosti (deanery) in the Diocese of Nord-Hålogaland. The gray, wooden chapel was built in a long church style in 1976. The chapel seats about 85 people.

See also
List of churches in Nord-Hålogaland

References

Ibestad
Churches in Troms
Wooden churches in Norway
20th-century Church of Norway church buildings
Churches completed in 1976
1976 establishments in Norway
Long churches in Norway